Ahmed Parker Yerima (born 8 May 1957) is a Nigerian academic, professor playwright and theater director. He was director-general of the Nigerian National Theatre, and has previously served as director of the National Troupe. He is a professor of Theater and Performing Arts and has been dean of the College of Humanities at Redeemer's University since 2013.

Early life
Yerima was born on 8 May 1957 in Lagos, where he had his primary education. He went on to Baptist Academy in Obanikoro, Lagos, for his secondary education.

Works
Though Yerima wrote in different genres of literature, most of his works are historical plays. Prominent among these are: The Trials of Oba Ovonramwen, Attahiru, Ameh Oboni the Great, The Angel, The Twist, Uncle Venyil, The Bishop and the Soul, The Wives, The Mirror Cracks, The Lottery Ticket, Kaffir's Last Game, The Sisters, Mojagbe, Little Drops, Heart of Stone, Yemoja, Orisa Ibeji, Otaelo, and Hard Ground. His use of proverbs in three of his plays has been described and analysed by Taiwo Oluwaseun Ehineni.

Further reading 
Eruaga, Abigail Obiageli. "Patriarchy and Illusion of Women Empowerment in Ahmed Yerima's Jakadiya." Ibadan Journal of English Studies 7 (2018):211–220.

References

1957 births
20th-century Nigerian novelists
21st-century male writers
21st-century Nigerian novelists
Alumni of University College London
Living people
Nigeria Prize for Literature winners
Nigerian dramatists and playwrights
Nigerian male novelists
Obafemi Awolowo University alumni